Air Chief Marshal Pradeep Vasant Naik, PVSM, VSM served as the 22nd Chief of the Air Staff of the Indian Air Force. He took office on 31 May 2009 following the retirement of Air Chief Marshal Fali Homi Major and was succeeded in office by Air Chief Marshal Norman Anil Kumar Browne.

Career
Naik was born on 22 July 1949 at Nagpur, Maharashtra and was commissioned into the Indian Air Force on 21 June 1969 as a fighter pilot. He is an alumnus of Sainik School, Satara and National Defence Academy, Khadakwasla in Maharashtra. During his 42 years of service, he has served in a variety of command staff and instructional appointments. 

Naik has over 3,000 hrs of flying on his log. He also took part in air actions during the Indo-Pakistani War of 1971 in the Eastern and Western sectors. Before taking over as Chief of Air Staff, he was the Vice Chief of Air Staff of the Indian Air Force.  Naik has also served as the Air Officer Commanding-in-Chief of the Allahabad-based, Central Air Command. 
 
Besides being a fellow of the National Defence College, New Delhi, Naik is a Qualified Flying Instructor and a Fighter Combat Leader. He has served as Directing staff at DSSC Wellington, India and at Tactics & Air Combat Development Establishment (TACDE).

Advisor 
Currently, he is a member of the Board of Advisors of India's International Movement to Unite Nations (I.I.M.U.N.).

Personal life
Naik and his wife Madhubala have two sons; the elder was a fighter pilot with the Indian Air Force and later transferred to the transport stream, and the younger, a Chief Officer in the Merchant Navy.

Awards

References

External links

|-

1949 births
Living people
Chiefs of Air Staff (India)
Vice Chiefs of Air Staff (India)
Marathi people
Recipients of the Param Vishisht Seva Medal
Sainik School alumni
Indian Air Force officers
National Defence College, India alumni